Adrián "Adri" Pavón Leiva (born 16 March 1989) is a Spanish professional footballer who plays for Mairena.

External links 
 
 
 

1989 births
Living people
Sportspeople from the Province of Córdoba (Spain)
Spanish footballers
Footballers from Andalusia
Association football midfielders
Segunda División players
Segunda División B players
Tercera División players
Sevilla FC C players
Sevilla Atlético players
CD San Roque footballers
Lucena CF players